Azariah ( ‘Ǎzaryāh, "Yah has helped") is the name of several people in the Hebrew Bible and Jewish history, including:

 Abednego, the new name given to Azariah who is the companion of Daniel, Hananiah, and Mishael in the Book of Daniel
 Azariah (guardian angel), the name given Raphael as companion of Tobias in the Book of Tobit.
 Azariah, the guardian angel of Maria Valtorta to whom one of her handwritten books is dedicated 
 Azariah (prophet), a prophet
 Azariah (high priest) high priest of Israel
 Azariah II, another high priest, in the reign of Uzziah
 Eleazar ben Azariah, the Mishnaic sage
 Uzziah, King of Judah, also known as Azariah
Two "commanders of the hundreds" who formed part of Jehoiada's campaign to restore the kingship to Joash in 2 Chronicles 23: Azariah, son of Jeroham and Azariah son of Obed.

Other people named Azariah
 Azariah Flagg (1790–1873), New York politician
 Azariah S. Partridge (1834–1901), Michigan state representative
 Azariah Wart (1822–1900), New York assemblyman
 Vedanayagam Samuel Azariah (1874–1945), Anglican bishop of Dornakal, India

References

See also
 Azaria (disambiguation)
 Azarian (surname)
 Azaryan (surname)
 Azarias (given name)

 Ben Azariah (disambiguation)